Broadwell is the fifth generation of the Intel Core Processor. It is Intel's codename for the 14 nanometer die shrink of its Haswell microarchitecture. It is a "tick" in Intel's tick–tock principle as the next step in semiconductor fabrication. Like some of the previous tick-tock iterations, Broadwell did not completely replace the full range of CPUs from the previous microarchitecture (Haswell), as there were no low-end desktop CPUs based on Broadwell.

Some of the processors based on the Broadwell microarchitecture are marketed as "5th-generation Core" i3, i5 and i7 processors. This moniker is however not used for marketing of the Broadwell-based Celeron, Pentium or Xeon chips. This microarchitecture also introduced the Core M processor branding.

Broadwell is the last Intel platform on which Windows 7 is supported by either Intel or Microsoft; however, third-party hardware vendors have offered limited Windows 7 support on more recent platforms.

Broadwell's H and C variants are used in conjunction with Intel 9 Series chipsets (Z97, H97 and HM97), in addition to retaining backward compatibility with some of the Intel 8 Series chipsets.

Design and variants 
Broadwell has been launched in three major variants:
 BGA package:
 Broadwell-Y: system on a chip (SoC); 4.5 W and 3.5 W thermal design power (TDP) classes, for tablets and certain ultrabook-class implementations. GT2 GPU was used, while maximum supported memory is 8 GB of LPDDR3-1600. These were the first chips to roll out, in Q3/Q4 2014. At Computex 2014, Intel announced that these chips would be branded as Core M. TSX instructions are disabled in this series of processors because a bug that cannot be fixed with a microcode update exists.
 Broadwell-U: SoC; two TDP classes 15 W for 2+2 and 2+3 configurations (two cores with a GT2 or GT3 GPU) as well as 28 W for 2+3 configurations. Designed to be used on motherboards with the PCH-LP chipset for Intel's ultrabook and NUC platforms. Maximum supported is up to 16 GB of DDR3 or LPDDR3 memory, with DDR3-1600 and LPDDR3-1867 as the maximum memory speeds. The 2+2 configuration is scheduled for Q4 2014, while the 2+3 is estimated for Q1 2015. For Broadwell-U models with integrated 5x00 GPUs, die size is 82 mm2 with a total of 1.3 billion transistors, while for the models with 6100 and 6200 GPUs the die size is 133 mm2 with a total of 1.9 billion transistors.
 Broadwell-H: 37 W and 47 W TDP classes, for motherboards with HM86, HM87, QM87 and the new HM97 chipsets for "all-in-one" systems, mini-ITX form-factor motherboards, and other small footprint formats. It was expected to come in two different variants, as single and dual chips; the dual chips (4 cores, 8 threads) would have GT3e and GT2 GPU, while a single chip (SoC; two cores, four threads) would have GT3e GPU. Maximum supported memory is 32 GB of DDR3-1600. These are scheduled for Q2 2015.
 LGA 1150 socket:
 Broadwell-DT: quad-core unlocked desktop version with GT3e integrated graphics (Iris Pro 6200) and 128 MB of eDRAM L4 cache, in a 65 W TDP class. Announced to be backward compatible with the LGA 1150 motherboards designed for Haswell processors.
LGA 2011-1 socket:
Broadwell-EX: Brickland platform, for mission-critical servers. Intel QuickPath Interconnect (QPI) is expected to be updated to version 1.1, enabling seamless scaling beyond eight-socket systems. Maximum supported memory speeds are expected to be DDR3-1600 and DDR4-1866. Up to 24 core and 48 threads, up to 60 MB of L3 cache and 32 PCI Express 3.0 lanes, with 115–165 W TDP.
 LGA 2011-v3 socket:
Broadwell-EP: to be marketed as Xeon E5-2600 v4 etc., while using the C610 Wellsburg chipset platform.  Up to 22 cores and 44 threads, up to 55 MB of total cache and 40 PCI Express 3.0 lanes, with 55–160 W TDP classes.  Maximum supported memory speed is quad-channel DDR4-2400.
 Broadwell-E: HEDT platform, for enthusiasts. Announced at Computex 2016, it was released in July that year. Consisting of four processors: the 6800K, 6850K, 6900K, and the deca-core 6950X, with clock speeds ranging from 3 GHz to 4 GHz as well as up to 25 MB of L3 cache.

Instruction set extensions 
Broadwell introduces some instruction set architecture extensions:
 Intel ADX: ADOX and ADCX for improving performance of arbitrary-precision integer operations
 RDSEED for generating 16-, 32- or 64-bit random numbers from a thermal noise entropy stream, according to NIST SP 800-90B and 800-90C
 PREFETCHW instruction
 Supervisor Mode Access Prevention (SMAP) optionally disallows access from kernel-space memory to user-space memory, a feature aimed at making it harder to exploit software bugs.
 Transactional Synchronization Extensions: This instruction set is reintroduced for all versions of Broadwell except for Broadwell-Y because a bug that cannot be fixed via microcode update in Broadwell-Y and all versions of Haswell except for the Haswell-EX variants has been fixed with a new CPU stepping level. Erratum: In fact, among Broadwell i3, i5 and i7 CPUs, only four of them support TSX instructions (i7 5650U and 5600U, i5 5350U and 5300U); it is not even precised on Intel's website whether i5 5200U does support TSX instructions. (ark.intel.com/products/)

New features 
Broadwell's Intel Quick Sync Video hardware video decoder adds VP8 hardware decoding and encoding support. It adds VP9 and HEVC 10-bit decoding support through the integrated GPU. HEVC decode is achieved through a combination of the fixed function video decoder and shaders. Also, it has two independent bit stream decoder (BSD) rings to process video commands on GT3 GPUs; this allows one BSD ring to process decoding and the other BSD ring to process encoding at the same time.

Broadwell's integrated GPU supports on Windows Direct3D 11.2, OpenGL 4.4 (OpenGL 4.5 on Linux) and OpenCL 2.0. However, it is marketed as Direct3D-12-ready.
Broadwell-E introduced Intel Turbo Boost Max Technology 3.0.

List of Broadwell processors

Desktop processors

"Broadwell-E" HEDT (14 nm)

Embedded processors

Mobile processors

Core M Ultra Low Power Mobile Processors 

<li> When a cooler or quieter mode of operation is desired, this mode specifies a lower TDP and lower guaranteed frequency versus the nominal mode.
<li> This is the processor's rated frequency and TDP.
<li> When extra cooling is available, this mode specifies a higher TDP and higher guaranteed frequency versus the nominal mode.

Server processors

SoC processors

Server CPUs

Single/dual socket CPUs 

 Socket: LGA 2011-3
 Interface: PCIe 3.0

Roadmap and history 

On September 10, 2013, Intel showcased the Broadwell 14 nm processor in a demonstration at IDF. Intel CEO Brian Krzanich claimed that the chip would allow systems to provide a 30 percent improvement in power use over the Haswell chips released in mid-2013. Krzanich also claimed that the chips would ship by the end of 2013; however, the shipment was delayed due to low yields from Intel's 14 nm process.

On October 21, 2013, a leaked Intel roadmap indicated a late 2014 or early 2015 release of the K-series Broadwell on the LGA 1150 platform, in parallel with the previously announced Haswell refresh. This would coincide with the release of Intel's 9-series chipset, which would be required for Broadwell processors due to a change in power specifications for its LGA 1150 socket.

On May 18, 2014, Reuters quoted Intel's CEO promising that Broadwell-based PCs would be on shelves for the holiday season, but probably not for the back-to-school shopping.

Mobile CPUs were expected in Q4 2014 and high-performance quad-core CPUs in 2015. The mobile CPUs would benefit from the reduced energy consumption of the die shrink.

On June 18, 2014, Intel told CNET that while some specialized Broadwell-based products would be out in Q4 2014, "broader availability" (including mobile CPUs) would only happen in 2015.

, Broadwell CPUs were available to Intel's hardware partners in sample quantities. Intel was expected to release 17 Broadwell U series family microprocessors at CES 2015. Also, according to a leak posted on vr-zone, Broadwell-E chips would be available in 2016.

On August 11, 2014, Intel unveiled formally its 14 nm manufacturing process, and indicated that mobile variants of the process would be known as Core M products. Additionally, Core M products were announced to be shipping during the end of 2014, with desktop variants shipping shortly after.

With Broadwell, Intel focused mainly on laptops, miniature desktops, and all-in-one systems. This left traditional desktop users with no new socketed CPU options beyond fourth-generation Haswell, which first arrived in 2013. Even though the company finally introduced two Broadwell desktop chips in the summer of 2015, it launched its high-end sixth-generation Skylake CPUs very shortly thereafter. In September 2015, Kirk Skaugen, senior vice president and general manager of Intel's Client Computing Group, admitted that skipping desktops with Broadwell was a poor decision. Between the end-of-life for Windows XP in 2014 and the lack of new desktop chips, Intel had not given desktop PC users any good reasons to upgrade in 2015.

Releases 
On September 5, 2014, Intel launched the first three Broadwell-based processors that belong to the low-TDP Core M family, Core M 5Y10, Core M 5Y10a and Core M 5Y70.

On October 9, 2014, the first laptop with Broadwell Intel Core M 5Y70 CPU, Lenovo Yoga 3 Pro, was launched.

On October 31, 2014, four more Broadwell based CPUs were launched belonging to Core M Family, increasing the number of launched Broadwell CPUs to seven.

On January 5, 2015, 17 additional Broadwell laptop CPUs were launched for the Celeron, Pentium and Core i3, i5 and i7 series.

On March 31, 2016, Intel officially launched 14 nm Broadwell-EP Xeon E5 V4 CPUs.

On May 30, 2016, Intel officially launched 14 nm Broadwell-E Core i7 69xx/68xx processor family.

See also 
 List of Intel CPU microarchitectures
 List of Intel Core M microprocessors

Notes

References

External links 
 Intel to launch Broadwell "U" series CPUs at CES 2015

Computer-related introductions in 2014
Intel x86 microprocessors
Intel microarchitectures
Transactional memory
X86 microarchitectures